Jaime Luis Sánchez Rodríguez (born December 19, 1938) is a Puerto Rican stage, film and television actor, active since the 1950s.

Stage
Jaime Luis Sánchez Rodríguez, appearing as Jamie Sanchez, began his acting career on Broadway at the age of 18 in 1957, when he played Chino in the original cast of West Side Story. He also performed in numerous off-Broadway theater productions, including an appearance as Marc Antony in Joseph Papp's 1979 production of William Shakespeare's Julius Caesar.

Film
Sánchez' film appearances include Frank Perry's David and Lisa (1962), Sidney Lumet's The Pawnbroker (1964), Cornel Wilde's Beach Red (1967) and Sam Peckinpah's The Wild Bunch (1969). He also had two different roles in both Brian De Palma's Carlito's Way (1993) and its 2005 prequel, Carlito's Way: Rise to Power, directed by Michael Bregman.

1962: David and Lisa (Frank Perry) - Carlos
1964: The Pawnbroker (Sidney Lumet) - Jesus Ortiz
1965: Heroina (Jeronimo Mitchell Melendez) - Chico 
1967: Beach Red (Cornel Wilde) - Colombo
1969: The Wild Bunch (Sam Peckinpah) - Angel
1969: El escuadrón del pánico (Nuestro Regimiento) (Manuel Mur Oti)
1970: Arocho y Clemente (Miguel Ángel Álvarez) - Arocho
1971: La Palomilla (Efrain Lopez Neris)
1973: Serpico (Sidney Lumet) -  Cop (uncredited)
1974: The Minutes and Hours (Frany Sardou)
1976: The Next Man (Richard C. Sarafian) - New York security 
1977: Bobby Deerfield (Sydney Pollack) - Delveccio
1980: On the Nickel (Ralph Waite) - Joe
1985: Invasion USA (Joseph Zito) - Castillo
1986: Big Trouble (John Cassavetes) - Terrorist chief
1986: Florida Straits (Mike Hodges) (TV Movie) - Innocente
1992: In the Soup (Alexandre Rockwell) - Uncle Theo
1992: Bad Lieutenant (Abel Ferrara) - Priest
1993: Carlito's Way (Brian De Palma) - Rudy
1995: Fear of Man (short film) (William Nunez) (Short) - The patrol leader
1996: Looking for Richard (Al Pacino) - Himself
1998: The City (La Ciudad) (David Riker) - The director of the clothing store
2002: Piñero (Leon Ichaso) - Miguel's father
2005: The Krutch (half-hour film) (Judith R. Escalona) (Short) - Dr. Guzman
2007: 3 Americas (Cristina Kotz Cornejo) - Henry
2011: The King Hector Lavoe (Antony Felton) - Hector Maisonave
2011: Diega! (James Aviles Martin) - Guillermo Diego
In production : An Artist's Emblem (Michael J. Narvaez) - Paco the activist

Television
Sánchez' TV appearances include The Fugitive, Kojak, The Equalizer, and the second season of Sesame Street, in which he appeared as Miguel from 1970 to 1971.

2005 : Carlito's Way: Rise to Power'' (Michael Bregman) : Eddie

Honors
In 2002, Sánchez received the HOLA Lifetime Achievement Award from the Hispanic Organization of Latin Actors (HOLA).

In 2008, Jaime Sánchez was invited and honored by the Bar Association of Puerto Rico (Colegio de Abogados de Puerto Rico), in an event that also honored pioneer actor Juano Hernández posthumously.

References

Bibliography

External links

Jaime Sánchez at the Lortel Archives
Jaime Sanchez at the University of Wisconsin's Actors Studio audio collection

1938 births
Living people
People from Rincón, Puerto Rico
Puerto Rican male film actors
Puerto Rican male television actors
Puerto Rican male stage actors